"The Boy in the Bubble" is a song by the American singer-songwriter Paul Simon. It was the third single from his seventh studio album, Graceland (1986), released on Warner Bros. Records. Written by Simon and Forere Motloheloa (an accordionist from Lesotho), its lyrics explore starvation and terrorism, juxtaposed with wit and optimism.

The single—released in February 1987—performed well on charts worldwide. In the United States, it was mainly successful on the Album Rock Tracks chart, where it peaked at No. 15. Outside the U.S., "The Boy in the Bubble" was a top 20 hit in the Netherlands, and top 30 in the United Kingdom and Belgium.

Background
The song retains the only lyric Simon managed to compose on his South African trip: "The way the camera follows us in slo-mo, the way we look to us all." The imagery in the video, directed by Jim Blashfield, was inspired by film clips of the John F. Kennedy assassination, as well as Ronald Reagan's attempted assassination. The song's title was presumably inspired by the medical cases of David Vetter and Ted DeVita. The chorus also references "the baby with the baboon heart," presumably referring to Baby Fae.

He said, "Hope and dread... that's the way I see the world—a balance between the two, but coming down on the side of hope."

"The Boy in the Bubble," like "Graceland," took three to four months to create.

Cash Box said it was “another brilliant cross-cultural gem. African rhythms, zydeco spice and Simon’s intelligent, penetrating lyrics are near perfection."

Personnel
Paul Simon – lead vocals, acoustic guitar
Ladysmith Black Mambazo – background vocals
Rob Mounsey – synthesizer
Adrian Belew – guitar synthesizer
Forere Motloheloa – accordion
Bakithi Kumalo – bass
Vusi Khumalo – drums
Jacob Childress  – percussion

Chart performance
"The Boy in the Bubble" performed on singles charts in several territories worldwide. In the U.S., the song reached a peak of No. 86 on the Billboard Hot 100 on March 21, 1987; it spent four weeks on the chart as a whole. It performed better on the magazine's Album Rock Tracks chart, where it placed at No. 15 on March 28, 1987, where it spent nine weeks total.

In the United Kingdom, the song premiered on the UK Singles Chart on November 30, 1986 at number 81, and rose over the following weeks to a peak of No. 26 on January 11, 1987. On the Dutch Nationale Top 100, it reached a peak of No. 16. On Belgium's Ultratop 50, it hit No. 28, and in New Zealand, it peaked at No. 43.

Charts

Notes

References

Sources

External links

1987 singles
1986 songs
Paul Simon songs
Songs written by Paul Simon
Song recordings produced by Paul Simon
Music videos directed by Jim Blashfield
Warner Records singles
Worldbeat songs